Faro's Daughters may refer to:

Faro Ladies, a pejorative term for aristocratic female gamblers in the late eighteenth century
Faro's Daughter, a 1941 historical romance novel by Georgette Heyer

See also
Faro (disambiguation)